Commezzadura (local dialect: Comezadurå) is a comune (municipality) in Trentino in the northern Italian region Trentino-Alto Adige/Südtirol, located about  northwest of Trento.

Commezzadura borders the following municipalities: Rabbi, Malè, Mezzana, Dimaro Folgarida, and Pinzolo.

Demographic evolution

References

Cities and towns in Trentino-Alto Adige/Südtirol